Malek Jaziri (born January 20, 1984) is a Tunisian former professional  tennis player. Jaziri reached his highest singles ranking on the ATP Tour of World  42 in January 2019.

He reached the final of the 2018 Istanbul Open, the semifinals in Moscow in 2012, Winston-Salem in 2015, Dubai in 2018 and the quarterfinals in Dubai in 2014.

Jaziri has been a member of the Tunisia Davis Cup team since 2000, posting an 33–15 record in singles and a 10–14 record in doubles in 41 ties.

He primarily played on the Futures circuit and the Challenger circuit. 

Jaziri was coached by Tunisian legend Haythem Abid on and off throughout his career.

He is currently coaching Vasek Pospisil and is the captain of Tunisia’s Davis Cup team.

Career

2010
He appeared in the qualifying draw at the 2010 Australian Open, losing in the first round to Michał Przysiężny of Poland.

2011: Grand Slam debut
Jaziri qualified for the 2011 US Open, defeating Brian Dabul, Michael Ryderstedt, and Guillaume Rufin in the qualifying draw. This was the first time Jaziri played in the main draw of a Grand Slam tournament. In the first round, Jaziri defeated world No. 159, Thiemo de Bakker, in four sets. Jaziri lost to world No. 8, Mardy Fish, in the second round.

2012: Top 100 debut
In 2012, he kicked off his year at the ATP 250 event in Doha as a wildcard and pushed world No. 6, Jo-Wilfried Tsonga, to three sets in the first round. He fell in the first round of qualifying at the 2012 Australian Open to Tim Smyczek. He then reached three Challenger finals in Quimper, Kyoto, and Pingguo to break into the top 100 for the first time.

In his clay-court season, he made the semifinals in the Barletta Challenger and played his first Roland Garros main draw, winning his first-round match over German Philipp Petzschner before losing a tight second-round match to Spaniard Marcel Granollers, missing two match points.

On grass, he reached the second round in his 2012 Wimbledon Championships debut (lost to Kohlschreiber) and also the second round at the London Olympics (lost to John Isner).

He lost in the 2012 US Open first round, but later had his best result on the ATP World Tour when he reached the semifinals of the 2012 Kremlin Cup in Moscow, where he lost to eventual champion Andreas Seppi, to become the first Tunisian male to reach the semifinals of an ATP event.

2013: Loss of form, out of top 200
In 2013, Jaziri started off the year in Dubai as a wildcard, where he faced 17-time Grand Slam champion, Roger Federer and lost in three tight sets.

2015-2017: Two Australian Open third rounds, top 50 
Jaziri started off 2015 by making his first appearance at the Australian Open main draw, and beating Mikhail Kukushkin and Edouard Roger-Vasselin, making him the first Arab male tennis player to make it to the third round of a Grand Slam in over a decade. Jaziri then lost in the third round to Australian teen Nick Kyrgios.

He reached the top 50 on 3 October 2016. He also reached the third round again at the 2017 Australian Open.

2018-2019: First ATP final, Career high ranking in top 45
In 2018, he played against Gilles Müller at the Australian Open.

At the Dubai Tennis Championships, Jaziri as a wildcard, stunned top seed and then world No. 4, Grigor Dimitrov, to register his first win against a top-10 player. He reached the semifinals defeating Robin Haase and wildcard Stefanos Tsitsipas.

Jaziri made his first ATP final at the 2018 Istanbul Open, where he played Japanese-American Taro Daniel, who had also reached his maiden final and won the title.

2020-2023: Eight wildcard in Doha and Dubai, Retirement
Before the COVID season, he received a wildcard for the 2020 Qatar ExxonMobil Open and for the 2020 Dubai Tennis Championships.

At the 2021 Qatar Open, Jaziri recorded as a wildcard, his 100th win on the ATP Tour against Norbert Gombos.
He received a wildcard for the next 2022 edition in Qatar (his eight overall at this tournament) as well as for Dubai in 2021, 2022, and in 2023 (his eight overall at this tournament) where he officially retired after playing his last match.

Controversies

2013
Jaziri was embroiled in a controversial political incident, in which he withdrew from a tournament rather than play an Israeli player. In the October 2013 Tashkent Challenger, tournament in Tashkent, Uzbekistan, he was slated to play Israeli Amir Weintraub in the quarterfinals. But the Tunisian tennis federation ordered Jaziri by email to withdraw from the match, and he did so.

Weintraub said that Jaziri is "a good friend," and that "he really wanted to play." Israel Tennis Association CEO Shlomo Glickstein said: "It is sad to me that these kinds of things still happen. I feel bad for the athletes who find themselves embroiled in such situations, which end up hurting their careers.”

Jaziri was cleared of wrongdoing by the ATP, but the International Tennis Federation (ITF) found that the Tunisian Tennis Federation breached the ITF constitution by ordering him not to compete. The organization barred Tunisia from competing in the 2014 Davis Cup. ITF president Francesco Ricci Bitti said: "There is no room for prejudice of any kind in sport or in society. The ITF Board decided to send a strong message to the Tunisian Tennis Federation that this kind of action will not be tolerated by any of our members."

2015

In February 2015, Jaziri was again embroiled in a controversial political incident when he withdrew from a tournament before facing Israeli players. He withdrew from both the singles and doubles events at the Open Sud de France, citing an elbow injury, after winning his first set in his singles match against Denis Istomin of Uzbekistan. Had Jaziri won, he would have been scheduled to face Israeli Dudi Sela in the next round. In the doubles event, he and Spanish partner Marc López would have faced Israeli opponent Jonathan Erlich and František Čermák of the Czech Republic in the quarterfinals.

The ATP said that they had confirmed with on-site medical staff that Jaziri's elbow injury was genuine, but opened an inquiry, stating: "Given a previous incident involving the player's national federation in 2013, we are looking into any wider circumstances of his withdrawal as a matter of prudence." On February 10, the ATP closed its investigation after extensive discussions with Jaziri and medical staff, saying it was satisfied that Jaziri had a legitimate medical reason to retire from the event.

ATP career finals

Singles: 1 (1 runner-up)

Future and Challenger finals

Singles: 35 (17–18)

Doubles 21 (14–7)

Performance timelines

Singles

Doubles

Record against top-10 players

Jaziri's record against those who have been ranked in the top 10, with active players in boldface.

Wins over top 10 players
He has a 3–13 (.188) record against players who were, at the time the match was played, ranked in the top 10.

References

External links
 
 
 
 
 
 

1984 births
Living people
Tunisian male tennis players
Tennis players at the 2012 Summer Olympics
Tennis players at the 2016 Summer Olympics
Olympic tennis players of Tunisia
People from Bizerte
Mediterranean Games silver medalists for Tunisia
Mediterranean Games bronze medalists for Tunisia
Competitors at the 2013 Mediterranean Games
Mediterranean Games medalists in tennis
21st-century Tunisian people